Aarhus Commuter Rail was a commuter rail service in and near Aarhus, Denmark.

There was one line, from Odder to Grenaa, with 33 stations. This traffic concept started in 2012, when the traffic on the two local railways Odderbanen and Grenaabanen was combined into one line, with new rolling stock. The rolling stock was Siemens Desiro diesel multiple units. 

The line closed in August 2016 for electrification and conversion to light rail service.

From 2017 both railways will be defined as light rail, and be equipped with electric power supply. Also, a new city tramway has been built in central Aarhus. New trams will be used for this. This concept is called Aarhus Letbane (Aarhus light rail).

See also
 List of commuter rail systems

External links

 Banedanmark
 DSB

Regional rail in Denmark
2012 establishments in Denmark
Railway services introduced in 2012
Infrastructure in Aarhus
Rail transport in Aarhus